Anisul Huq or Anisul Hoque meaning "friend of the truth", is a Muslim male given name. Notable people with the name include:

Anisul Haque Chowdhury (Rangpur politician) (died 2011),  Bangladesh Awami League Member of Parliament
 Annisul Huq (1952–2017), Bangladeshi businessman and mayor of Dhaka North City Corporation
 Anisul Huq (politician) (born 1956), Bangladeshi politician and current Minister for Law, Justice and Parliamentary Affairs
 Anisul Hoque (born 1965), Bangladeshi writer

Arabic masculine given names